Taylor Hill Teagarden (born December 21, 1983) is an American former professional baseball catcher. He has  played in Major League Baseball (MLB) for the Texas Rangers from 2008 to 2011, the Baltimore Orioles in 2012 and 2013, the New York Mets in 2014 and the Chicago Cubs in 2015.

Early life
Teagarden graduated from Creekview High School in Carrollton, Texas in 2002.

Teagarden attended the University of Texas at Austin, where he was a catcher on the Texas Longhorns baseball team. Most notably, Teagarden played on the Longhorns' 2005 NCAA Championship team, which won the College World Series.

Major league career

Texas Rangers
Taylor was drafted in the third round of the 2005 Major League Baseball Draft by the Texas Rangers.  His first major league hit (a solo home run) happened on July 20, 2008. It came off Minnesota Twins pitcher Scott Baker in the top of the 6th, who, until then, had not given up a hit all game. It would end up being the only run of the game in a Rangers 1–0 victory. In his first 40 plate appearances he had 10 extra base hits, a record tied in 2018 by first baseman Rowdy Tellez for the most by any ballplayer since 1913. Teagarden played for the 2008 USA Olympic Team.

Sent to Double-A Frisco early in the 2010 season, Teagarden was called back up to the Majors in July 2010 due to the injuries of catcher Matt Treanor.  While at Double-A Frisco, he finished fourth in the fan vote for A.L. catcher for the 2010 All-Star game with 631,674 votes, above Major League catchers John Buck of the Blue Jays, Mike Napoli of the Angels and A. J. Pierzynski of the White Sox.  Teagarden hit three home runs in his first five games after his July recall from the minors.

Baltimore Orioles
He was traded to the Baltimore Orioles for minor-league pitcher Randy Henry and a player to be named later on December 1, 2011. However, he began the 2012 season on the disabled list due to lower-back injuries. He was cleared to begin baseball activities on June 1, 2012 and began his minor league rehab games with the Double-A Bowie Baysox on July 6. On the same day he was activated by the Orioles off the disabled list on July 14, he hit a two-run, two-out homer off Joaquín Benoit to end a 13-inning 8–6 victory over the Detroit Tigers at Camden Yards. He was designated for assignment on September 1, 2013 and subsequently became a free agent.

New York Mets
Teagarden signed a minor league deal with the New York Mets with an invite to Spring Training on January 6, 2014. The Mets selected Teagarden's contract from the Triple-A Las Vegas 51s on June 8. He hit a grand slam in his first game for the Mets on June 10 against the Milwaukee Brewers, the second grand slam of his career. Teagarden elected free agency in October 2014.

Chicago Cubs
On January 10, 2015, Teagarden signed a minor league deal with the Chicago Cubs. In early July, the Cubs needed catching depth and called up Teagarden to backup starter Miguel Montero behind the plate. Teagarden was batting .294 with 19 RBI in 43 games for the Iowa Cubs.

PED usage
On December 26, 2015, Teagarden was named in an Al Jazeera report linking him to performance-enhancing drugs (PED) usage. Teagarden is shown in an undercover video talking about his PED usage in years past. Teagarden initially made no comment on the video. On April 1, 2016   Teagarden was suspended 80 games for violating the MLB's Joint Drug Prevention and Treatment Program.

Teagarden ended his career following the conclusion of the 2017 season.

References

External links

1983 births
Living people
Baseball players at the 2008 Summer Olympics
Baseball players from Dallas
Major League Baseball catchers
Olympic bronze medalists for the United States in baseball
People from Carrollton, Texas
Medalists at the 2008 Summer Olympics
Texas Rangers players
Baltimore Orioles players
New York Mets players
Chicago Cubs players
Texas Longhorns baseball players
Spokane Indians players
Arizona League Rangers players
Frisco RoughRiders players
Bakersfield Blaze players
Surprise Rafters players
Estrellas Orientales players
American expatriate baseball players in the Dominican Republic
Oklahoma RedHawks players
Oklahoma City RedHawks players
Round Rock Express players
Bowie Baysox players
Delmarva Shorebirds players
Gulf Coast Orioles players
Norfolk Tides players
Las Vegas 51s players
St. Lucie Mets players
Gulf Coast Mets players
Iowa Cubs players